Sprague Pond is located southeast of Blue Mountain Lake, New York. Fish species present in the lake are brown trout, golden shiner, and sunfish. There is a carry down via trail off CR-12, on the south shore. No motors are allowed on this lake.

References

Lakes of New York (state)
Lakes of Hamilton County, New York